The 121st district of the Texas House of Representatives contains parts of northern Bexar County. The current Representative is Steve Allison, who was first elected in 2018.

References 

121